Kurseong Assembly constituency is an assembly constituency in Darjeeling district in the Indian state of West Bengal.

Overview

As per orders of the Delimitation Commission, No. 24 Kurseong Assembly constituency covers Kurseong municipality, Kurseong community development block, Mirik municipality, Mirik community development block, Rangli Rangliot community development block, Gorabari Margaret's Hope, Lower Sonada I, Lower Sonada II, Munda Kothi and Upper Sonada gram panchayats of Jorebunglow Sukhiapokhri community development block, and (i) Sitong Forest (Village), (ii) Sivok Hill Forest (Village), and (iii) Sivok Forest (Village) in Champasari GP of Matigara community development block.

Kurseong Assembly constituency is part of No. 4 Darjeeling (Lok Sabha constituency).

Members of Legislative Assembly

Election results

2021 Election

In the 2021 West Bengal Legislative Assembly election, Bishnu Prasad Sharma of BJP defeated his nearest rival Tshering Lama Dahal of GJM (Binay faction).

2016 Election

In the 2016 West Bengal Legislative Assembly election, Rohit Sharma of GJM defeated his nearest rival Shanta Chhetri of TMC.

2011 Election

In the 2011 West Bengal Legislative Assembly election, Rohit Sharma of GJM defeated his nearest rival Pemu Chhetri of GNLF.

References

Assembly constituencies of West Bengal
Politics of Darjeeling district